Will Flynt (born November 23, 1967 in Escondido, California) is a former professional baseball player who played professionally in Taiwan and Japan.  FLynt played for the Osaka Kintetsu Buffaloes in the Pacific League.  He later worked as a coach in the Frontier League.

References

1967 births
Living people
American expatriate baseball players in Japan
Osaka Kintetsu Buffaloes players
Sportspeople from Escondido, California